David Bowie (commonly known as Space Oddity) is the second studio album by English musician David Bowie. After the commercial failure of his 1967 self-titled debut album, Bowie acquired a new manager, Kenneth Pitt, who commissioned a promotional film in hopes of widening the artist's audience. For the film, Bowie wrote a new song, titled "Space Oddity", a tale about a fictional astronaut. The song earned Bowie a contract with Mercury Records, who agreed to finance production of a new album, with Pitt hiring Tony Visconti to produce. Due to his dislike of the song, Visconti appointed engineer Gus Dudgeon to produce a re-recording for release as a lead single, while he produced the rest of the album.

Recording for the new album began in June 1969 and continued until early October, at Trident Studios in London. It featured an array of collaborators, including Herbie Flowers, Rick Wakeman, Terry Cox and the band Junior's Eyes. Departing from the music hall style of Bowie's 1967 debut, David Bowie instead features folk rock and psychedelic rock songs. Lyrically, the songs contain themes that were influenced by events happening in Bowie's life at the time, including former relationships and festivals he attended. Released as a single in July 1969, "Space Oddity" peaked at number five in the UK later in the year, earning Bowie his first commercial hit.

David Bowie was released in the UK on 14November 1969 through Mercury affiliate Philips Records. For the US release, Mercury retitled it Man of Words/Man of Music and used different artwork. Due to a lack of promotion, the album was a commercial failure, despite earning some positive reviews from music critics. Following Bowie's commercial breakthrough with his fifth studio album Ziggy Stardust in 1972, RCA Records reissued the album under the title of Space Oddity, and used a contemporary photo of Bowie as the artwork. The reissue charted in both the UK and the US.

Retrospectively, David Bowie has received mixed reviews from critics and biographers, many criticising the lack of cohesiveness. Bowie himself later stated that the album lacked musical direction. Debate continues as to whether it should stand as Bowie's first "proper" album. David Bowie has been reissued numerous times, with bonus tracks and variance on the inclusion of the hidden track "Don't Sit Down". Labels have used both David Bowie and Space Oddity as the title, with Space Oddity being used for its 2019 remix by Visconti.

Background 
After a string of unsuccessful singles, David Bowie released his music hall-influenced self-titled debut studio album through Deram Records in 1967. It was a commercial failure and did little to gain him notice, becoming his last release for two years. Around this time he also acquired a new manager, Kenneth Pitt. In 1968, Bowie began a relationship with dancer Hermione Farthingale, which lasted until February 1969. After the commercial failure of David Bowie, Pitt authorised a promotional film in an attempt to introduce Bowie to a larger audience. The film, Love You till Tuesday, went unreleased until 1984, with it marking the end of Pitt's mentorship to Bowie.

Knowing Love You till Tuesday wouldn't feature any new material, Pitt asked Bowie to write something new. Encompassing the feeling of alienation, Bowie wrote "Space Oddity", a tale about a fictional astronaut named Major Tom. Its title and subject matter were influenced by Stanley Kubrick's 2001: A Space Odyssey, which premiered in May 1968. Demoed as early as January 1969, "Space Oddity" was finalised and recorded on 2February at Morgan Studios in London. The session was produced by Jonathan Weston and featured Bowie and guitarist John "Hutch" Hutchinson on co-lead vocals. This version appears in Love You till Tuesday. In April 1969, Bowie and Hutchinson recorded demos of tracks that would appear on David Bowie, including another demo of "Space Oddity", and ones of "Janine", "An Occasional Dream", "Letter to Hermione" (titled "I'm Not Quite") and "Cygnet Committee" (titled "Lover to the Dawn").

When Bowie met Angela Barnett in late 1968, she was dating Lou Reizner, the head of Mercury Records in London. After meeting Bowie, Barnett consulted with Mercury's Assistant European Director of A&R Calvin Mark Lee, whom she met through Reizner, to secure Bowie a contract with Mercury. Lee, after hearing "Space Oddity", knew that the song was his chance to get Bowie signed, so Lee went behind Reizner's back to finance a demo session. Lee told biographer Marc Spitz: "We had to do it all behind Lou's back. But it was such a good record." Pitt, unaware of these proceedings, attempted to earn Bowie a contract with other labels, including Atlantic Records in March 1969. On 14April, at Bowie's request, Pitt met with Simon Hayes, Mercury's New York director, and screened him Love You till Tuesday with Lee. In 2009, Lee stated that Bowie earned a contract with Mercury because of Hayes. Bowie's new contract, enacted in May 1969, granted Bowie enough finances to make a new album, with two one-year renewal options. The album would be distributed through Mercury in the US and its affiliate Philips Records in the UK.

Recording 
After failing to get George Martin, Pitt hired Tony Visconti, who produced Bowie's later Deram sessions, to produce the new album. Before recording for the album commenced, "Space Oddity" had been selected as the lead single. However, Visconti saw it as a "novelty record" and passed the production responsibility for the song on to Bowie's former engineer Gus Dudgeon. Dudgeon later recalled: "I listened to the demo and thought it was incredible. I couldn't believe that Tony didn't want to do it...he said, 'That's great, you do that and the B-side, and I'll do the album.' I was only too pleased." In an interview with Mary Finnigan for IT in 1969, Bowie compared the two producers:

Recording for David Bowie officially began on 20June 1969 at Trident Studios in London, where work commenced on the new version of "Space Oddity" and its B-side "Wild Eyed Boy from Freecloud"; Mercury insisted on the single being released in a month's time, ahead of the Apollo 11 moon landing. The lineup consisted of Bowie, bassist Herbie Flowers, Rick Wakeman, who played Mellotron, drummer Terry Cox, Junior's Eyes guitarist Mick Wayne and an orchestra arranged by Paul Buckmaster. After the single release of "Space Oddity" on 11July 1969, recording continued on 16July, with work commencing on "Janine", "An Occasional Dream" and "Letter to Hermione"; Work on the former two tracks continued into 17July. With Visconti producing, he recruited the Junior's Eyes band – guitarists Wayne and Tim Renwick, bassist John Lodge and drummer John Cambridge (but without vocalist Graham Kelly) – as the main backing band for the sessions; Bowie hired Keith Christmas as an additional guitarist. Also joining the sessions as an engineer was Ken Scott, who recently finished multiple works with the Beatles. Regarding Bowie's attitude towards the recording sessions, Renwick recalled how the band found him "kind of nervous and unsure of himself", further stating that he was vague and gave little direction throughout the sessions. Biographer Paul Trynka attributes the lack of direction to the numerous events happening in Bowie's personal life at the time. On the other hand, Visconti remained enthusiastic during the sessions despite having little production experience at the time: "I was not a very good producer yet and I hadn't started to engineer. I had only made the first Tyrannosaurus Rex album and the Junior's Eyes album," he later stated.

Recording continued on and off for the next few months. On 3August 1969, Bowie received the news that his father John Jones was seriously ill; he died two days later. Bowie wrote "Unwashed and Somewhat Slightly Dazed" to express grief. On 16August, Bowie participated in the Beckenham Free Festival, commemorating "Memory of a Free Festival" after it. Biographer Nicholas Pegg writes that around this time, Bowie's "disillusion" with the "slack attitude" of hippies around him caused him to reshape the lyrics of "Cygnet Committee". On 8September, the backing band began recording for "Memory of a Free Festival". Three days later, recording for "God Knows I'm Good" was attempted at Pye Studios in Marble Arch, but scrapped due to problems with the recording equipment. The song was re-recorded at Trident on 16September, with Christmas joining on guitar. Recording officially finished on 6October 1969.

Music and lyrics 
The music on David Bowie has been described as folk rock and psychedelic rock, with elements of country and progressive rock. Biographer David Buckley writes that: "Bowie was still reflecting the governing ideologies of the day and the dominant musical modes...rather than developing a distinct music of his own." Kevin Cann finds the musical ground on the album to encompass "a fusion of acoustic folk leanings with a growing interest in electric rock". Cann continues that David Bowie marked a turning point for the artist, in that lyrically he began "drawing on life" rather than writing "winsome stories". Spitz considers the album to be Bowie's first "heavy" record and also one of his darkest, due to the death of his father. He writes that it reflects the artist's "darkening vision" and depicts "a man coming of age in a world that is increasingly depraved and barren". Susie Goldring of BBC Music calls David Bowie a "kaleidoscopic album [that] is an amalgamation of [Bowie's] obsessions – directors, musicians, poets and spirituality of a distinctly late-60s hue".

Songs
"Space Oddity" is a largely acoustic number augmented by the eerie tones of the composer's stylophone, a pocket electronic organ. Some commentators have also seen the song as a metaphor for heroin use, citing the opening countdown as analogous to the drug's passage down the needle prior to the euphoric "hit", while noting Bowie's admission of a "silly flirtation with smack" in 1968. "Unwashed and Somewhat Slightly Dazed" reflects a strong Bob Dylan influence, with its harmonica, edgy guitar sound and snarling vocal. Spitz describes the song as an "extensive hard rock jam", while Buckley calls it a "country-meets-prog-rock collision of ideas". Heard at the end of that track on the UK Philips LP was "Don't Sit Down", an unlisted 40-second jam. The hidden track was excluded from the US Mercury release and RCA reissue of the album. Author Peter Doggett criticises the track's inclusion, calling it "pointless and disruptive", and believes "the album is stronger without it".

"Letter to Hermione" was a farewell ballad to Bowie's former girlfriend Hermione Farthingale, who is also the subject of "An Occasional Dream", a gentle folk tune reminiscent of the singer's 1967 debut album. "God Knows I'm Good", Bowie's observational tale of a shoplifter's plight, also recalls his earlier style. "Cygnet Committee" has been called Bowie's "first true masterpiece". Commonly regarded as the track on David Bowie most indicative of the composer's future direction, its lead character is a messianic figure "who breaks down barriers for his younger followers, but finds that he has only provided them with the means to reject and destroy him". Bowie himself described the song at the time as a put down of hippies who seemed ready to follow any charismatic leader. "Janine" was written about a girlfriend of Bowie's childhood friend George Underwood. It has been cited as another track that foreshadowed themes to which Bowie would return in the 1970s, in this case the fracturing of personality, featuring the words "But if you took an axe to me, you'd kill another man not me at all".

The Buddhism-influenced "Wild Eyed Boy from Freecloud" is presented in a heavily expanded form compared to the original guitar-and-cello version on the B-side of the "Space Oddity" single; the album cut features a 50-piece orchestra. "Memory of a Free Festival" is Bowie's reminiscence of an arts festival he had organised in August 1969. Its drawn-out fade/chorus ("The Sun Machine is coming down / And we're gonna have a party") was compared to the Beatles' "Hey Jude"; the song has also been interpreted as a derisive comment on the counterculture it ostensibly celebrates. The background vocals for the crowd finale features Bob Harris, his wife Sue, Tony Woollcott and Marc Bolan. "Conversation Piece," an outtake from the sessions, which has been described as featuring "a lovely melody and an emotive lyric addressing familiar Bowie topics of alienation and social exclusion," was released for the first time as a single B-side in 1970.

Title and packaging 
In the UK, the album was released under the eponymous title David Bowie, the same name as Bowie's 1967 debut for Deram, a move Trynka calls "bizarre". The original UK cover artwork featured a facial portrait of Bowie taken by British photographer Vernon Dewhurst, exposed on top of a work by Hungarian artist Victor Vasarely with blue and violet spots on a green background. The artwork, titled CTA 25 Neg, was designed by Bowie and Lee, who enthusiastically collected Vasarely's works; Lee is credited as CML33. The back cover was an illustration by Underwood and depicted lyrical aspects from the album, stylistically similar to that of the 1968 Tyrannosaurus Rex album My People Were Fair and Had Sky in Their Hair... But Now They're Content to Wear Stars on Their Brows. Underwood's illustration was based on initial sketches by Bowie. According to Underwood, the sketches included "a fish in water, two astronauts holding a rose, [and] rats in bowler hats representing the Beckenham Arts Lab committee types he was so pissed off with". Pegg writes that these items appear in the final picture, along with "a Buddha, a smouldering joint, an unmistakable portrait of Hermione Farthingale, and a weeping woman (presumably the shoplifter in 'God Knows I'm Good') being comforted by a Pierrot", which he notes is  "remarkably similar in appearance" to the "Ashes to Ashes" character Bowie later adopted. Underwood's illustration is referred to on the sleeve as Depth of a Circle, which according to Bowie was a typo by the record label; he intended it to read Width of a Circle, a title he used for a song on his next album, The Man Who Sold the World (1970). Apart from Bowie, none of the musicians who played on David Bowie were credited on the original pressings, due to the majority being under contract with other labels in the UK; song lyrics were instead presented on the inner gatefold sleeve.

For the US release in 1970, the album was renamed Man of Words/Man of Music, although Cann writes that this phrase was added to the cover to describe the artist and was not intended to replace the title. Mercury also changed Vasarely's artwork in favour of a different, but similar photograph by Dewhurst, placed against a plain blue background. Cann criticises this artwork, stating that it "suffered from sloppy technical application and the image appeared washed out as a result of poor duplication of the transparency". However, the musicians were credited on this release, while song lyrics still appeared on the inner gatefold. Cambridge later said in 1991: "[Bowie] showed me a copy; I was really pleased to see I was credited inside. I kept on to [Bowie] to let me have it and he kept saying 'It's my only copy.' Eventually, he gave in and gave it to me. I've still got it."

In 1972, as part of a reissue campaign undertaken by RCA Records in the wake of the commercial breakthrough of his fifth studio album Ziggy Stardust, David Bowie was repackaged with the title Space Oddity, after the opening track. For this release, the front cover was updated with a new photograph of Bowie taken the same year by photographer Mick Rock at Haddon Hall. The sleeve notes proclaimed that the album "was NOW then, and it is still now NOW: personal and universal, perhaps galactic, microcosmic and macrocosmic".

Rykodisc's 1990 reissue, again titled Space Oddity, used the 1972 front cover photograph as its cover, while also incorporating a reproduction of the 1970 US front cover. For the 1999 EMI reissue, the original UK portrait was restored, although the Space Oddity name was retained. EMI's 40th anniversary CD reissue in 2009 and the various releases of the album associated with the 2015 Five Years (1969–1973) box set reverted to the original David Bowie title and kept the UK artwork. For the album's 2019 remix, the Space Oddity title was used.

Release and promotion
"Space Oddity" was released as a single on 11July 1969, with "Wild Eyed Boy from Freecloud" as the B-side. Featuring different edits between the British and American versions, the song was rush-released by the label – it was recorded only three weeks prior – as a way to capitalise on the Apollo 11 moon landing. Although it received some glowing reviews, the single initially failed to sell, despite attempts made by Pitt at chart-rigging. By September 1969 however, the single debuted on the UK Singles Chart at number 48, slowing rising to number 5 by early November. Mercury's publicist Ron Oberman wrote a letter to American journalists describing "Space Oddity" as "one of the greatest recordings I've ever heard. If this already controversial single gets the airplay, it's going to be a huge hit." Despite this, the single flopped completely in the US, which Pitt attributed to Oberman's use of the word "controversial" in his statement; this caused it to be banned on multiple radio stations across the country. The single's success in the UK earned Bowie a number of television appearances throughout the rest of 1969, including his first appearance on Top of the Pops in early October.

David Bowie was released in the UK on 14November 1969 through Philips Records, with the catalogue number SBL 7912. Cann states that Mercury considered releasing "Janine" as a follow-up single to "Space Oddity", but were uncertain about the song's commercial appeal and scrapped it. Biographer Christopher Sandford writes that despite the commercial success of "Space Oddity", the remainder of the album bore little resemblance to it and resulted in David Bowie being a commercial failure on its initial release. Furthermore, around the same time as the album's release, personnel at Philips underwent numerous changes, some of whom were Bowie's supporters, resulting in a severe lack of promotion for the album. Despite Bowie being named 1969's Best Newcomer in a readers' poll for Music Now! and "Space Oddity" being named record of the year by Penny Valentine of Disc and Music Echo, David Bowie barely sold over 5,000 copies by March 1970. Following the 1972 reissue by RCA, the album finally managed to chart, peaking at number 17 on the UK Albums Chart in November 1972, remaining on the chart for 42 weeks. It also peaked at number 16 on the US Billboard Top LPs & Tape chart in April 1973, remaining on the chart for 36 weeks. The album's 1990 reissue also managed to chart at number 64 in the UK.

Critical reception
Upon release, the album received primarily mixed reviews from music critics. Valentine gave the album a positive review, describing it as "rather doomy and un-nerving, but Bowie's point comes across like a latter-day Dylan. It is an album a lot of people are going to expect a lot from. I don't think they'll be disappointed." A reviewer for Music Now! offered similar praise, calling it "[d]eep, thoughtful, probing, exposing, gouging at your innards" and concluded: "This is more than a record. It is an experience. An expression of life as others see it. The lyrics are full of the grandeur of yesterday, the immediacy of today and the futility of tomorrow. This is well worth your attention." Nancy Erlich of The New York Times, in a review published over a year after its release, praised the album, calling it, "a complete, coherent and brilliant vision".

Other reviewers offered more mixed sentiments. A writer for Music Business Weekly found that "Bowie seems to be a little unsure of the direction he is going in", criticising the various musical styles found throughout, ultimately describing the record as "over-ambitious". A reviewer for Zygote praised "Space Oddity" and "Memory of a Free Festival", but felt the album as a whole lacks cohesiveness and is "very awkward to the ear". The reviewer concluded that "Bowie is erratic. When he succeeds, he's excellent; when fails, he's laborious." The Village Voice critic Robert Christgau considered this album and The Man Who Sold the World to be "overwrought excursions".

Subsequent events
Following the release of David Bowie, Bowie spent the next month promoting the album through live performances and interviews. In mid-December 1969, Philips requested a new version of "Space Oddity" with Italian lyrics upon learning one had already been recorded in Italy. The Italian version was recorded on 20 December at Morgan Studios, with accent coach and producer Claudio Fabi producing and lyrics being translated by Italian lyricist Mogol. This version, titled "Ragazzo solo, ragazza sola" (meaning "Lonely Boy, Lonely Girl"), was released as a single across Italy in 1970 and failed to chart.

In January 1970, Bowie began arrangements to re-record an older Deram-era composition, "London Bye Ta-Ta", along with a new composition, "The Prettiest Star". Recording for both tracks began at Trident on 7 January and continued on 13 January, being completed two days later. Guitar work was provided by Marc Bolan on "The Prettiest Star". "London Bye Ta-Ta" was initially chosen as the follow-up single to "Space Oddity" but at the last minute, Bowie chose "The Prettiest Star" against Pitt's wishes. Released as a single on 6 March, with the outtake "Conversation Piece" as the B-side, "The Prettiest Star" received praise from music journalists, but failed to chart.

Following the commercial failure of "The Prettiest Star", the label requested the follow-up to be a re-recording of the album track "Memory of a Free Festival", which was set to be split across and A- and B-sides. The two-part single was released on 26 June 1970 and again, failed to chart. By this time, Bowie had completed recording The Man Who Sold the World, which marked a shift in musical style towards hard rock. Around the same time, due to continuing managerial disputes, Bowie terminated his contract with Pitt and hired a new manager, Tony Defries.

Legacy

Retrospectively, David Bowie has continued to receive primarily mixed reviews from reviewers, with many criticising its lack of cohesiveness. Although feeling that the record has its moments, Dave Thompson of AllMusic writes: "'Space Oddity' aside, Bowie possessed very little in the way of commercial songs, and the ensuing album (his second) emerged as a dense, even rambling, excursion through the folky strains that were the last glimmering of British psychedelia." Douglas Wolk of Pitchfork found that Bowie presents numerous ideas throughout the record, but does not know what to do with them, writing, "he wears his influences on his sleeve and constantly overreaches for dramatic effect". Terry Staunton of Record Collector agreed, writing: "Space Oddity may be regarded as the singer's first 'proper' album, though its mish-mash of styles and strummy experiments suggest he was still trying to settle on an identity."

The album's 40th anniversary remaster garnered numerous reviews. Mike Schiller of PopMatters stated that although it's far from Bowie's best, the record as a whole is "not half bad". Despite its flaws, Schiller considers the record a "landmark" in Bowie's catalogue, writing that "it offers a glimpse at a man transitioning into the artist we've come to know". Stuart Berman of Pitchfork found that the record's "prog-folk hymnals" were a precursor to the "artful glam-rock" sound that made Bowie a star. Reviewing for The Quietus, John Tatlock found that the album is not where "it all came together", primarily due to a lack of coherence. Tatlock also believed it to not stand out on its own merit, but nonetheless, stated that "it captures its creator at a fascinating crossroads, and is much more than a fans-only curio".

Biographers have differing views on David Bowie. While Buckley calls it "the first Bowie album proper", NME editors Roy Carr and Charles Shaar Murray have said, "Some of it belonged in '67 and some of it in '72, but in 1969 it all seemed vastly incongruous. Basically, David Bowie can be viewed in retrospect as all that Bowie had been and a little of what he would become, all jumbled up and fighting for control..." Trynka similarly states that the record has an "endearing lack of artifice", which nonetheless makes it a "unique" entry in the artist's catalogue. Pegg calls the album "a remarkable step forward from anything Bowie had recorded before". He writes that a few of the tracks, including "Unwashed and Somewhat Slightly Dazed", "Wild Eyed Boy from Freecloud" and "Cygnet Committee", highlight Bowie's evolution as a lyricist. However, he ultimately believes that the "monolithic reputation" of "Space Oddity" does the album more harm than good. Spitz opinions that "while not iconic, as his seventies albums would become, Space Oddity is first-rate as trippy rock records go". Sandford writes that "Space Oddity" aside, the record doesn't have a "voice", and also lacked "punch" and "clarity". He continues that the songs vary between "mundane" (highlighting the two tributes to Farthingale) and "mawkish" (highlighting "God Knows I'm Good"). However, he further stated that the record, like his 1967 debut, does have its moments, signaling out "Unwashed and Somewhat Slightly Dazed" and "Janine".

Reissues
David Bowie was first released on CD by RCA in 1984. In keeping with the 1970 Mercury release and the 1972 RCA reissue, "Don't Sit Down" remained missing. The German (for the European market) and Japanese (for the US market) masters were sourced from different tapes and not identical for each region. In 1990, the album was reissued by Rykodisc/EMI with "Don't Sit Down" included as an independent song and three bonus tracks. It was issued again in 1999 by EMI/Virgin, without bonus tracks but with 24-bit digitally remastered sound and again including a separately listed "Don't Sit Down".  These early CD releases used the Space Oddity album name.

In 2009, the album was released by EMI/Virgin, under its original David Bowie title, as a remastered 2-CD special edition, with a second bonus disc compilation of unreleased demos, stereo versions, previously released B-sides, and BBC Radio session tracks. "Don't Sit Down" reverted to its status as a hidden track. The 2009 remaster became available on vinyl for the first time in June 2020, in a picture disc release (with artwork based on the 1972 RCA reissue). In 2015, the album was remastered for the Five Years (1969–1973) box set. It was released in CD, vinyl and digital formats, both as part of this compilation and separately.

In 2019, David Bowie was remixed and remastered by Visconti, and released, with the Space Oddity title, in the CD boxed set Conversation Piece, and separately in CD, vinyl, and digital formats. The new version of the album added the outtake "Conversation Piece" to the regular sequencing of the album for the first time, while omitting "Don't Sit Down".

Track listing 
All tracks are written by David Bowie.

Side one
 "Space Oddity" – 5:16
 "Unwashed and Somewhat Slightly Dazed" – 6:55
 "Letter to Hermione" – 2:33
 "Cygnet Committee" – 9:35

Side two
 "Janine" – 3:25
 "An Occasional Dream" – 3:01
 "Wild Eyed Boy from Freecloud" – 4:52
 "God Knows I'm Good" – 3:21
 "Memory of a Free Festival" – 7:09

Personnel 
Album credits per the 2009 reissue liner notes and biographer Nicholas Pegg.

 David Bowie – vocals, acoustic guitar, stylophone ("Space Oddity"), chord organ ("Memory of a Free Festival"), kalimba
 Tim Renwick – electric guitar, flute, recorder
 Keith Christmas – acoustic guitar
 Mick Wayne – guitar
 Rick Wakeman – Mellotron, electric harpsichord
 Tony Visconti – bass guitar, flute, recorder
 Herbie Flowers – bass guitar
 John "Honk" Lodge – bass guitar
 John Cambridge – drums
 Terry Cox – drums
 Benny Marshall and friends – harmonica, backing vocals ("Memory of a Free Festival")
 Paul Buckmaster – cello

Production
 Tony Visconti – producer
 Gus Dudgeon – producer ("Space Oddity")

Charts

Notes

References

Sources

External links 

1969 albums
Albums produced by Gus Dudgeon
Albums produced by Tony Visconti
Albums recorded at Trident Studios
Albums with cover art by Mick Rock
David Bowie albums
EMI Records albums
Mercury Records albums
Parlophone albums
Philips Records albums
RCA Records albums
Rykodisc albums
Virgin Records albums